The Flames of Wrath, is a 1922 American black-and-white silent crime drama film directed and produced by Maria P. Williams. The film stars Maria P. Williams and Frank Colbert in the lead roles. John Burton, Roxie Mankins and Charles Pearson have supporting roles. The film also the first film ever produced by an African-American woman. This is Williams' first and only film. The film begins with the murder and robbing of P.C. Gordon and one thief, C. Dates, is arrested. But he escapes prison and searches for the ring he buried. The story moves with searching of ring and the catching of Dates by prosecutor.

The film consisting of five reels. The film reel was considered lost for decades until the UCLA Young Research Library obtained a single frame of the movie in the acquisition of George P. Johnson‘s papers in 1992. Then the film was released in 1923.

Cast
 Maria P. Williams as Prosecuting attorney
 Frank Colbert as C. Dates
 John Burton as William Jackson
 Roxie Mankins as Pauline Keith
 Charles Pearson as Guy Braxton
 Anna Kelson as Flora Fulton
 John Lester Johnson as Frank Keith

References

External links 
 

1923 films
American silent films
American crime drama films
1920s American films
Silent American drama films